(See Inside) is the fifth album by Out of the Grey, released on April 1, 1997. It was their first album not produced by Charlie Peacock.

Track listing

Notes
 "That's Where I Live" is the first Out of the Grey song (excluding instrumentals) to feature no prominent vocals by Christine Denté. Scott Denté sings all of the lead vocals, due to having written the song in a key too low to comfortably fit Christine's vocal range.
 Similarly, the sparse closing track "Joy" is one of few Out of the Grey songs which appears to be exclusively performed by Christine Denté. Scott's vocals and guitars are not heard in this song.
 Christian radio often played the track "Disappear" from this album in '97 and '98, and still remains a fan favorite. It also appears in the compilation album WOW 1998.

Personnel 

Out of the Grey
 Christine Denté – lead vocals (1-6, 8, 9, 10), backing vocals (1-9)
 Scott Denté – acoustic guitars (1-9), backing vocals (1-9), lead vocals (7)

Additional personnel
 Phil Madeira – Hammond B3 organ (1, 4), Mellotron (4), electric guitar (7)
 Carl Marsh – Fairlight cello (1), concertina (7), string arrangements (10)
 Blair Masters – keyboards (2–5, 7)
 Shane Keister – acoustic piano (10)
 Gordon Kennedy – electric guitars (1-9), electric sitar (1)
 Jerry McPherson – additional verse guitar (1), guitar effects (2, 8), electric guitar (3), Ebow (4), dulcimer (5), guitar outro (5)
 Jimmie Lee Sloas – bass (1-6, 8, 9)
 Tommy Sims – bass (7)
 Danny Duncan – drum loops 
 Steve Brewster – drums (1-9)
 Eric Darken – percussion (1, 2, 5, 9)
 John Catchings – cello (10)
 Pamela Sixfin – violin (10)
 Chloe Gloria Denté – additional vocal stylings (9)
 Brown Bannister – flawed pitch wheel (2)

Production
 Brown Bannister – producer at Sound Emporium, Nashville, Tennessee
 John Mays – executive producer
 Steve Bishir – recording, mixing (2, 8, 9, 10), reverb chamber (8)
 Eric Sarafin – mixing (1, 3-7)
 Hank Nirider – recording assistant, mix assistant (2, 8, 9, 10)
 Eric Greedy – mix assistant (1, 3-7)
 Steve Hall – mastering at Future Disc, Hollywood, California
 Traci Sterling Bishir – production coordination
 Karen Philpott – creative director
 Joyce Revoir – art direction, design
 Russ Harrington – photography
 Andrew Martin – photography
 Linda Medvene – stylist
 Melanie Shelley – make-up, hair stylist

Studios
 Overdubs – The Dugout, Nashville, Tennessee
 Mixing – Seventeen Grand Recording, Nashville, Tennessee

External links
 Album information at CCMplanet.

Out of the Grey albums
1997 albums
Albums produced by Brown Bannister